Sloboda is a rural locality (a village) in Gorodishchenskoye Rural Settlement, Nyuksensky District, Vologda Oblast, Russia. The population was 28 as of 2002.

Geography 
Sloboda is located 34 km southeast of Nyuksenitsa (the district's administrative centre) by road. Perkhushkovo is the nearest rural locality.

References 

Rural localities in Nyuksensky District